Samet Ağaoğlu (1909, Bakü - 6 Ağustos 1982, İstanbul) was a Turkish–Azerbaijani writer and politician. He was the son of the famous Azerbaijani and naturalized Turkish politician, publicist and journalist Ahmet Agaoğlu.

Early life 
He was born in 1909 in Baku. His father was Ahmet Ağaoğlu, his mother was Sitare Hanım. The family was originally from Shusha.

After the fall of the Azerbaijan Democratic Republic in 1920, the Ağaoğlu family moved to Turkey.

Samet graduated from Ankara University, Law School in 1931. After he went to Strasbourg for study PhD, but returned because his father's financial situation was not well.

Political career 
He joined the Democratic Party when he began practicing law. He won the 1950, 1954 and 1957 elections and was elected a member of parliament from Manisa. He was a member of the IX, X, XI Parliament of Turkey. He served as Deputy Prime Minister from 1950 to 1952, Minister of Labor from 1952 to 1953, and Minister of Commerce from 1954 to 1958. He was arrested during a military coup on May 27, 1960 and sentenced to life imprisonment. He was pardoned in 1964 while imprisoned in Yassiada. After that, he was not directly involved in politics.

Literary career 
Samet Ağaoğlu, who started writing in high school, published a magazine called "Hep Gençlik" with friends such as Behçet Kemal Çağlar and Ahmet Muhip Dıranas between 1929-1931.

He appeared with his first stories about his life in Strasbourg. Because of his political work, he published his books at long intervals, but he did not break with the literature until the end of his life. Samet Ağaoğlu, who also wrote many articles with political content, published his stories and essays in important magazines of the period such as Varlık, Yücel, and Çığır. He also used the signature of Samet Agayef in his writings.

He came to his homeland Azerbaijan in 1967 and dedicated a chapter of the book "Soviet Russian Empire" to Azerbaijan.

Works 

Stories: 
 1944 Strassburg Hatıraları
 1950 Zürriyet
 1953 Öğretmen Gafur
 1957 Büyük Aile
 1964 Hücredeki Adam
 1965 Katırın Ölümü

Memories:
 1940 Babamdan Hatıralar
 1958 Babamın Arkadaşları
 1965 Aşina Yüzler
 1967 Arkadaşım Menderes
 1972 Marmara'da Bir Ada
 1973 Demokrat Parti'nin Doğuş ve Yıkılış Sebepleri-Bir Soru
 1978 İlk Köşe
 1992 Siyasi Günlük:Demokrat Partinin Kuruluşu

Review:

 1944 Kuvayı Milliye Ruhu
 1947 İki Parti Arasındaki Siyasi Farklar

Travel:

 1967 Sovyet Rusya İmparatorluğu

Family 
His father Ahmet Agaoğlu was a prominent Azerbaijani and naturalized Turkish politician, publicist and journalist. He was one of the founders of Pan-Turkism. His sister Süreyya Ağaoğlu was a writer, jurist, and the first female lawyer in Turkish history. His sister Tezer Taşkıran writer, politician and teacher. She was one of the Turkey's first women member of parliament. His wife Neriman Ağaoğlu was a politician too.

References 

1909 births
1982 deaths
Ankara University Faculty of Law alumni
Burials at Feriköy Cemetery
Writers from Baku
Turkish writers
20th-century Turkish writers
Soviet emigrants to Turkey
Turkish people of Azerbaijani descent
Deputies of Manisa
Members of the 9th Parliament of Turkey
Members of the 10th Parliament of Turkey
Members of the 11th Parliament of Turkey
Ministers of Labour and Social Security of Turkey
Deputy Prime Ministers of Turkey
Istanbul High School alumni
Ağaoğlu family